Greater San Luis Potosí is the urban conglomerated which results of the fusion of the cities of San Luis Potosí and Soledad with other communities around the zone. This metropolitan area is the 11th largest in Mexico and has a population of 1.07 million.

Greater San Luis Potosí is formed by the communities and cities of:
San Luis Potosí 
Soledad de Graciano Sánchez 
Cerro de San Pedro 
Mexquitic de Carmona 
Villa de Pozos 
La Pila 
Escalerillas
Bocas 

This region is the most important urban zone in the whole state of San Luis Potosí, and there is concentrated a third part of the population of this. Also it is the main cultural, industrial and commercial centre.

Metropolitan areas of Mexico